The R753 road is a regional road in County Wicklow, Ireland. It travels from Aughrim to the R752 road, via the village of Ballinaclash.

References

Regional roads in the Republic of Ireland
Roads in County Wicklow